is a Japanese novel written by manga artist Hiroyuki Nishimori, published in 2012. A manga adaptation, illustrated by Yuuki Iinuma, was serialized in Shogakukan's seinen manga magazine Monthly Sunday Gene-X from August 2018 to September 2019.

Media

Novel
Manten no Hoshi to Aoi Sora, written by manga artist Hiroyuki Nishimori. It is Nishimori's debut work as novelist. An excerpt from the start of the novel was published by Shogakukan in Weekly Shōnen Sunday on June 13, 2012, and the novel was published on July 18 of the same year.

Manga
Shogakukan collected its chapters in three tankōbon volumes (the last volume was digital only published), released from December 12, 2018, to December 19, 2019.

See also
Nanimo nai Kedo Sora wa Aoi, another manga by Nishimori and Iinuma, inspired by the novel

References

External links
  

2012 Japanese novels
Manga based on novels
Seinen manga
Shogakukan manga
Survival anime and manga